Petrova is a commune in Maramureș County, Maramureș, Romania. It is composed of a single village, Petrova. The commune is situated near the border with Ukraine, on the left bank of the river Vișeu. The first documentary attestation was on 21 April 1411.

References

External links
 Official site

Communes in Maramureș County
Localities in Romanian Maramureș